The 2014 Rock Cup was the  season of Gibraltar's annual main knock-out football tournament. The competition began on 8 January 2014 with the First Round and ended with the final held on 10 May 2014.

The final was won by Lincoln Red Imps, beating College Europa with 1–0. As Lincoln had already been titled league champion, thus qualifying for 2014–15 UEFA Champions League, College Europa qualified for the first qualifying round of the 2014–15 UEFA Europa League.

The draw was held in December 2013 and completely laid out the road to the final with no additional draws needed. All matches were played in the Victoria Stadium.

First round
9 clubs from the Gibraltar Second Division and the Gibraltar national under-15 football team entered this round. These matches were played from 8 to 20 January 2014.

|}

Second round
5 winners from the first round and 11 additional clubs entered this round. These matches were played from 24 to 28 January  2014.

|}

Quarter-finals
Played from 7 to 9 March 2014.

|}

Semi-finals
Matches were played on 26 and 30 April

|}

Final

References

External links
Tournament at flashscore.com, Fixtures, results, bracket

Rock Cup
Rock Cup
Rock Cup